Ellen Foster is a 1987 novel by American novelist Kaye Gibbons. It was a selection of Oprah's Book Club in October 1997.

Plot introduction
The novel follows the story of Ellen, the first person narrator, a young white American girl living under unfavorable conditions somewhere in the rural South. 

The novel is not written in standard English. It is often grammatically incorrect (a egg sandwich, growed, etc.) and generally tries to render the language of a 9- through 11-year-old girl who, in spite of being clever and ambitious, is relatively uneducated.

The novel is most likely set in the late 1970s, due to the fact that Ellen states the following on page 48 when talking about her teacher-"She lived in the sixties. She used to be a flower child but now she is low key so she can hold a job."

Two time levels are intertwined throughout the book: one presenting Ellen's life from her present point of view, living with her "new mama"; and the other one telling Ellen's story from her mother's death and leading up to the present. The two time levels are united at the end of the novel, when Ellen is about twelve years old.

The reader can follow her life over the course of a bit more than two years.  A sequel, The Life All Around Me by Ellen Foster, was published in 2006. In the sequel, Ellen reveals that she lives in the sand hills piedmont region of North Carolina and that Ava Gardner's birthplace (near Smithfield, North Carolina) is down the road from her house.

Synopsis
Ellen is an only child who does not have a real home, even at the time when both her parents are still alive. Her father is "trash" and has a drinking problem, and the whole atmosphere is one of domestic violence. Her mother has a heart condition caused by "Romantic" Rheumatic fever and, when the novel opens, has to stay in the hospital. From an early age on, Ellen's thoughts center on how she could get rid of her father—she imagines killing him one way or another. When her mother is released from hospital Ellen's father treats her as badly as before, and it is up to Ellen to protect her mother from him. Soon, however, she takes an overdose of pills and dies while Ellen is lying next to her.

After her mother's premature death, Ellen, who is only eleven years of age, takes charge of the meager household finances. She starts accumulating money, as she realizes she will need money to have a better start later in life. In spite of her unhappy childhood Ellen is a smart girl; she borrows books from the library and is rather creative when it comes to spending her spare time. Her best friend, Starletta, is a young black girl who has poor, but kind parents. She is attracted to them although she has been brought up detesting "niggers" and although she herself cannot overcome all the racial prejudice that has been inculcated in her mind all her life. Ellen says she would never sleep in a "colored house". Also, she refuses to eat or drink anything when she is at Starletta's, remembering the myth that if a person uses the same glass or cup as "coloreds", the germs they have left on it will spread onto their lips and they will turn as dark as they are.

On the other hand, her father himself has his "colored buddies" with whom he drinks. Ellen's odyssey (almost in a picaresque vein) starts the night Ellen's father mistakes her for her mother.

 At Starletta's parents: After the first instance of abuse to her (not sexual), Ellen goes to Starletta's house, where she stays for the night.
 At Aunt Betsy's: On the following morning, having decided to leave her father for good, she packs all her belongings into a box and goes to Aunt Betsy, who has no children and whose husband has recently died. Betsy treats Ellen well, but she misunderstands Ellen about the permanence of Ellen's stay. Accordingly, when the weekend is over, Betsy turns her out again, and Ellen has to return to her father.
 At Julia's: When he starts beating her, her bruises are noticed at school and as a temporary solution, her free spirited art teacher invites Ellen to live with her and her husband, Roy. Ellen accepts, leaving with her few belongings and the money she has saved up over the past few months. Despite not completely understanding Julia and Roy's way of life, Ellen feels loved and happy. During the period of separations, her father tries to get her back by bribing her with money, but fails.
 At her grandmother's: Sooner or later the question of custody has to be settled in court. Ellen learns that her grandmother ("my mama's mama") is going to take care of her. A wealthy woman who can even afford two black household helps, her grandmother turns out to be a grumpy and bitter old woman who does not really love her granddaughter. She is referred to as the "bosslady" by her workers and she even makes Ellen work in the cotton fields during the summer. She also permanently reproaches Ellen for being her father's daughter and for taking after him, and claims Ellen is responsible for her own daughter's death. Furthermore, she says she knows that Ellen had sex with her father's colored friends (although this is not true). What is more, she suffers from severe mental illness and believes that people around the house, even her doctor, are stealing things from her. When she becomes ill she expects Ellen to nurse her, which Ellen dutifully does up to the time her grandmother dies.
 At Aunt Nadine's: Ellen's life does not improve when she is taken up by another of her mother's sisters, her aunt Nadine Nelson, who lives with her daughter Dora. Dora, who is the same age as Ellen, and Nadine are a self-sufficient pair who consider Ellen an intruder. The big quarrel occurs, of all days, on Christmas Day, when Dora gets many presents (toys mainly) and Ellen receives a single pack of white drawing paper, which she throws at Nadine's feet. Furthermore, Ellen takes much effort to paint a picture for her aunt and her cousin, but she overhears them describing her painting as "silly" and "cheap-looking". As an act of revenge, Ellen pretends she has a boyfriend who has given her a microscope for Christmas. Nadine calls her an "ungrateful little bitch" and tells her she does not want to see her again in her house.
 At her new mama's: In church Ellen encounters a nice and friendly woman, who she believes is called Mrs Foster, and her well-behaved children. She carefully plans to get in touch with them, and after her argument with Nadine she just packs her things together and goes to the house of the "Foster family". In reality, the "family" is a home for disadvantaged adolescents—a kind of foster family rather than a "real" family with the surname Foster. Orphaned after her father's death (of an aneurysm), Ellen does not tell us about the formalities she has to go through to be accepted, but the most important thing for her is that for the first time in her life she is given a warm welcome. Throughout the novel, the reader learns how beautiful her new home is. Ellen also overcomes her racial prejudice and is very glad that her new mama allows Starletta to spend the weekend with her at her new home.

Characters
 Ellen Foster is the 10-year-old protagonist of the novel. She suffers physical abuse and psychological abuse from her alcoholic father and after her mother commits suicide, is tossed around from one household to another. Throughout her journey, Ellen is hopeful that she will someday find a nice and loving home, which she eventually does.
 Daddy is the novel's antagonist. He abuses his daughter, Ellen, physically, sexually and psychologically. He suffers from alcoholism, and holds no job other than selling liquor and eventually drinks himself to death.
 Mama, Ellen's mother, has suffered from poor health, suffering from "romantic [rheumatic] fever" since childhood. When she is at last at the hospital, she is so severely depressed as a result of her husband's cruelty and her illness that she commits suicide by overdosing on prescription medication.
 Starletta is Ellen's black best friend, who helps Ellen to realize that skin color makes no difference in the quality of the person. She lives with her mother and father in a ramshackle cabin with no indoor toilet and they often provide Ellen with refuge from her father. Gradually, Starletta transforms from an unsophisticated child into a mature young woman, and she develops a crush on a white boy from school.
 New Mama, Ellen's foster mother, is everything for which Ellen could have hoped. New Mama is kind, caring, nurturing, always has enough money to pay for groceries, and has plenty of love to give Ellen and the other children she fosters.
 Mama's Mama, Ellen's grandmother on her mother's side, is old and miserly and treats Ellen with cruelty, as she strongly dislikes Ellen's father and seeks vengeance on him through Ellen. After winning custody of Ellen in court, she immediately sends her to work the fields with the black field hands on the farms she owns in the scorching summer heat. At the end of the summer, she dies of illness, even after Ellen has taken extraordinary good care of her.
 Mavis, a kind field worker on Ellen's grandmother's farm, takes Ellen under her wing and teaches her how to row the land and how to stay cool in the unbearable summer heat. She tells Ellen of how she had known her mother as a child and says that Ellen looks very much like her. Mavis has a large, happy family that Ellen admires and wants to emulate.
 Nadine, Ellen's aunt on her mother's side, is false and pretentious and lies to herself that she is wealthy and successful to gain confidence. She is forced to take Ellen for a short period of time, though she eventually kicks her out of the house on Christmas Day. She dotes on her daughter Dora and treats Dora like a small child, although she is the same age as Ellen.
 Dora, Ellen's cousin and daughter of Nadine, is a sheltered, spoiled brat who gets everything she wants when she wants it. She is a chronic pants-wetter, though she is the same age as Ellen.
 Julia, Ellen's grade school art teacher who takes her temporarily after another teacher learns that she is being abused at home. Julia is a hippie raised in the Northeast, who has migrated to the South after college with her husband, Roy. She is very liberal and encourages Ellen in her artistic endeavors.
 Roy, Julia's husband, is a progressively minded hippie who keeps an organic garden that he fertilizes with chicken manure, with which Ellen is fascinated. He bakes Ellen a lovely cake for her birthday and does not mind taking care of other household chores typically performed by a woman.
 Rudolph & Ellis are Ellen's uncles on her father's side, who agree to spy on Ellen and her father for Ellen's grandmother. They make inaccurate reports that Ellen is wild and a troublemaker and are compensated by Ellen's grandmother with large sums of money, some of which she instructs them to give to Ellen and her father for the bare necessities.
 'Stella, Ellen's foster sister at her new mama's house, is a big flirt and sits at the back of the bus with the boys on the way to school. As a seventh grader, she is a mother to a fatherless baby, Roger, and is the youngest mother Ellen has ever known.
 Roger is Stella's baby son who likes to crawl into Ellen's room and chew on objects he finds on the floor.
 Betsy is Ellen's aunt on her mother's side who allows Ellen to stay with her for a weekend and finds it funny when Ellen had misunderstood that she would be staying permanently. She is petty and bickers with Nadine, her sister, when their mother dies.
 Dolphin is the horse Ellen rides and cares for at her new mama's house.
 Jo Jo is Ellen's new foster sister who loves to dance to music with no words.

Edition
Virago Modern Classics No.450 (London, 1998), 126pp..

Television film
On December 14, 1997, a made-for-television film based on the book was aired on CBS as a Hallmark Hall of Fame movie, and is now on DVD. The movie was directed by John Erman, screenplay by Maria Nation and William Hanley. The movie is rated PG-13 for some abusive treatment of a child, and is 120 minutes including commercials. Production took place in Vancouver, British Columbia, Canada.

Cast:

 Julie Harris - Lenora Nelson
 Jena Malone - Ellen Foster
 Ted Levine - Bill Hammond
 Glynnis O'Connor - Charlotte Nelson Hammond
 Debra Monk - Aunt Nadine
 Kimberly J. Brown - Dora
 Barbara Garrick - Aunt Betsy
 Kate Burton - Abigail
 Željko Ivanek - Chief Inspector
 Lynne Moody - Mrs. Douglas
 Bill Nunn - Mr. Douglas
 Allison Jones - Starletta Douglas
 Amanda Peet - Julia Hobbs
 Timothy Olyphant - Roy Hobbs

External links
 Ellen Foster on Vintage Books
 Ellen Foster at the Internet Movie Database
 Ellen Foster on Oprah.com
 Ellen Foster study guide on SparkNotes

1987 American novels
Novels set in North Carolina
Hallmark Hall of Fame episodes
American novels adapted into films
1997 television films
1997 films
Films directed by John Erman
Fiction set in the 1970s